Robert Heller (10 June 1932 – 28 August 2012) was a British management journalist, management consultant, author of a series of management books, and the founding editor of Management Today.

Biography 
Born in London, Heller attended Christ's Hospital in the Sussex countryside, served in the Royal Army Service Corps, and then attended Jesus College, Cambridge, where he was awarded a double first in history.

In 1955 Heller started to work for the Financial Times, where in 1958 he was made US correspondent. In 1963 he moved to become business editor of The Observer.

In 1966 Heller was founding editor of Management Today, a monthly business magazine published by Haymarket Publishing, where he worked for two decades.  Here he started a second career as a writer of business books.

During the early 1970s, he started a relationship with gallerist Angela Flowers, who he eventually married in 2003. They had a daughter, Rachel Heller, born on 15 September 1973, who was born with Down's syndrome, and became an artist represented by Flowers Gallery.

Publications 
Heller wrote about 80 management books. A selection:
 1972. The Naked Manager
 1998. Essential Manager's Manual
 1999. Achieving Excellence
 2002. Manager's Handbook

References

External links 

 Robert Heller obituary at theguardian.com
 Articles of Robert Heller at management-issues.com
 Interview: Robert Heller on extensor.co.uk, 2006

1932 births
2010 deaths
British business theorists
British male journalists
Royal Army Service Corps soldiers
20th-century British Army personnel